Jewell Fjord, also known as "Jewell Inlet", is a fjord in Peary Land, northern Greenland. To the northwest, the fjord opens into the Lincoln Sea of the Arctic Ocean. It is part of the Northeast Greenland National Park.

History
The fjord is named after US Sgt. Winfield Scott Jewell (1850–1884), meteorologist and member of the ill-fated Lady Franklin Bay Expedition led by Arctic explorer Lt. Adolphus Greely. Jewell died of starvation and exposure during the expedition. His body was later recovered.

Geography
Jewell Fjord opens to the northwest to the Lincoln Sea on the shore of Nansen Land, southwest of Gardiner Fjord and northeast of Mascart Sound. Its mouth is located to the east of Distant Cape and west of Low Pynt. There are three glaciers discharging at its head. The sea in the area is almost permanently covered by ice.

See also
List of fjords of Greenland
Peary Land

References

External links
GNET GPS Station Jewell Fjord - Isaaffik Exploration of Northern Greenland
Arctic Field Projects
Fjords of Greenland